Bilis Qooqaani is a town in the Afmadow district of the Lower Juba (Jubbada Hoose) region of southern Somalia. The city is approximately 70 kilometers away from the Kenya-Somali border and has an estimated population of around 55,000 -80,000.

It is one of the poorest and most at-risk cities in the country and there is a great need for assistance. The people in this city and its environs have endured hardships such as war and drought. The two-decade civil war has virtually destroyed the livelihoods of this community and, as a result, there are high rates of illiteracy, diseases, and poverty.

People in this area depend on pond water, which is highly polluted, and malaria, which is common in this area, claims many lives every year, most of them women, children, and the elderly.
Due to a lack of healthcare facilities, women in this area deliver in their houses with the help of midwives who too do not have the training and the resources necessary to handle complicated deliveries. Three years ago, four young ladies have died from complications during labor. This incident, one of many, confirms the magnitude of the healthcare problems faced by many pregnant women in this region.
The plight of the people in this region is well documented and there is no effective central government in Somalia today that can address the basic needs of its people. According to a health assessment report done by the World Food Programme:

The region is one of the most affected by the drought-induced humanitarian crises that has recently affected Southern Somalia. Health services are inadequate in Afmadow/Hagar with no proper functioning health facilities and so most inhabitants get assistance from private pharmacies. There is one MCH run by local Ngo Dinh Diem NGO in the area of Afmadow with basic medical kit supply from UNICEF. However, other areas have not a single public post. Referral cases including severely malnourished children have nowhere to seek assistance. Some residents therefore resort to self-prescription and medication.

To address the healthcare needs of its members, the local community, in partnership with some of its members in the Diaspora studies Diaspora, has been striving with its meager resources to build a clinic in Qoqaani. The objectives of the clinic are to provide maternity and general health care services to Qoqaani and nearby villages. The clinic, which is currently run by two midwives, has only three bedrooms. However, due to lack of medical equipment and supplies, the clinic is unable to provide even the basic services needed to its community and thus it is in a dire need of help. The nearest medical facility (though itself underserved) is about 30 miles away from Qoqaani.

References

Qooqaani at Maplandia

Populated places in Lower Juba